Sandra Bookman (born October 8, 1959 in Beaumont, Texas) is an American television news reporter and weekend anchor. She is currently a reporter and anchor at WABC-TV in New York City. She co-anchors the 5 p.m., 6 p.m. and 11 p.m. weekend editions of Eyewitness News.

She joined the station in 1998 from WSB-TV in Atlanta, Georgia where she worked as weekend anchor and reporter from 1989 to 1998. She was previously weekend anchor at both Raleigh, North Carolina's WRAL-TV and in Beaumont, Texas' KFDM.

She has won three Emmy Awards for her reporting including Olympic Coverage and the aftermath of Valuejet Airlines Crash in the Everglades.

Bookman was an Olympic Reporter for ABC News for seven years and was the only Atlanta based reporter to cover the games from Atlanta before the bid and until the Olympic bombing in 1996. She also covered the 1992 Olympic games in Barcelona, Spain.

She graduated from University of Texas with a B.A. in  journalism and currently lives in Manhattan.

See also
 New Yorkers in journalism

External links
Sandra Bookman Biography

1959 births
American reporters and correspondents
American television journalists
American women television journalists
African-American television personalities
Living people
Television anchors from New York City
New York (state) television reporters
People from Beaumont, Texas
Journalists from Texas
21st-century African-American people
21st-century African-American women
20th-century African-American people
20th-century African-American women